In enzymology, a 3-hydroxypalmitoyl-[acyl-carrier-protein] dehydratase is an enzyme that catalyzes the chemical reaction

(3R)-3-hydroxypalmitoyl-[acyl-carrier-protein]  hexadec-2-enoyl-[acyl-carrier-protein] + H2O

Hence, this enzyme has one substrate, [[(3R)-3-hydroxypalmitoyl-[acyl-carrier-protein]]], and two products, [[hexadec-2-enoyl-[acyl-carrier-protein]]] and H2O.

This enzyme belongs to the family of lyases, specifically the hydro-lyases, which cleave carbon-oxygen bonds.  The systematic name of this enzyme class is (3R)-3-hydroxypalmitoyl-[acyl-carrier-protein] hydro-lyase (hexadec-2-enoyl-[acyl-carrier protein]-forming). Other names in common use include D-3-hydroxypalmitoyl-[acyl-carrier-protein] dehydratase, beta-hydroxypalmitoyl-acyl carrier protein dehydrase, beta-hydroxypalmitoyl thioester dehydratase, beta-hydroxypalmityl-ACP dehydrase, and (3R)-3-hydroxypalmitoyl-[acyl-carrier-protein] hydro-lyase.  This enzyme participates in fatty acid biosynthesis.

Structural studies

As of late 2007, only one structure has been solved for this class of enzymes, with the PDB accession code .

References

 

EC 4.2.1
Enzymes of known structure